The following elections occurred in the year 1976.

Africa
 1976–1977 Guinea-Bissau legislative election
 1976 Malawian general election
 1976 Mauritanian general election
 1976 Mauritian general election

Asia
 1976 Cambodian parliamentary election
 1976 Japanese general election
 1976 Singaporean general election

Australia
 1976 New South Wales state election
 1976 Tasmanian state election

Europe
 1976 Gibraltar general election
 1976 Irish presidential election
 1976 Italian general election
 1976 Maltese general election
 1976 Polish legislative election
 1976 Portuguese presidential election
 1976 Portuguese legislative election
 1976 Portuguese local election
 1976 Stockholm municipal election
 1976 Swedish general election

France
 1976 French cantonal elections

Germany
 1976 West German federal election

The Americas

Canada
 1976 Brantford municipal election
 1976 Ontario municipal elections
 1976 Ottawa municipal election
 1976 Progressive Conservative leadership election
 1976 Quebec general election
 1976 Toronto municipal election

Caribbean
 1976 Antigua and Barbuda general election
 1976 Barbadian general election
 1976 Jamaican general election
 1976 Trinidad and Tobago general election

El Salvador  
 1976 Salvadoran legislative election

United States
 1976 United States presidential election
 1976 United States Senate elections
 1976 United States House of Representatives elections
 1976 United States gubernatorial elections

United States gubernatorial
 1976 United States gubernatorial elections
 1976 Washington gubernatorial election

California
 United States House of Representatives elections in California, 1976

New Mexico
 United States Senate election in New Mexico, 1976

North Carolina
 United States presidential election in North Carolina, 1976

South Carolina
 United States House of Representatives elections in South Carolina, 1976

United States House of Representatives
 United States House of Representatives elections in South Carolina, 1976
 1976 United States House of Representatives elections
 United States House of Representatives elections in California, 1976

United States Senate
 1976 United States Senate elections
 United States Senate election in Massachusetts, 1976
 United States Senate election in New Mexico, 1976
 United States Senate election in North Dakota, 1976

Oceania
 1976 Nelson by-election

Australia
 1976 New South Wales state election
 1976 Tasmanian state election

South America

Falkland Islands
 1976 Falkland Islands general election

See also

 
1976
Elections